Ikechukwu Uche (born 5 January 1984) is a Nigerian professional footballer who plays as a striker.

Known for his acrobatic goal celebrations, he spent most of his professional career in Spain, having arrived in the country before the age of 20. He amassed La Liga totals of 194 matches and 42 goals over nine seasons, representing in the competition Recreativo, Getafe, Zaragoza, Villarreal, Granada and Málaga.

Uche appeared for Nigeria in two Africa Cup of Nations.

Club career

Early years
Born in Aba, Abia, Uche's career began in his country with Amanze United and Iwuanyanwu Nationale. Aged just 18, he moved to Racing de Ferrol in the Spanish second division, appearing in 24 games in his second season, which ended in relegation for the Galician team.

Uche then joined another club in the country's second level, Recreativo de Huelva, for a fee of US$300,000, and scored 12 goals in his first year, becoming the league's top scorer in the 2005–06 campaign at 20 in just 28 appearances (with five braces), as the Andalusians returned – as champions – to La Liga after a three-year absence.

In his first top flight season, Uche scored on eight occasions. Notably, he netted in three consecutive matches in November 2006 (with wins at RC Celta de Vigo and against CA Osasuna), helping Recre finish eight.

Uche joined Madrid's Getafe CF for 2007–08, mainly being used as a substitute. On 29 November 2008, also from the bench, he scored in a 3–1 home victory over Real Madrid.

Zaragoza
Real Zaragoza, recently returned to the top flight, agreed terms to sign Uche in July 2009, subject to medical. He was presented officially on the 22nd, and signed a four-year contract; in only his second match, a 1–4 loss at Sevilla FC, he suffered a severe knee injury, going on to miss seven months.

Uche recovered fully for Zaragoza's 2010–11 pre-season. However, he soon suffered another knee injury, being ruled out for another six months; his return to action took place on 19 February 2011 as he played 20 minutes in a 0–1 home defeat against Atlético Madrid, hitting David de Gea's bar in the dying minutes of the game after an individual effort.

On 2 March 2011, Uche made his first start of the season, at home against Athletic Bilbao. On the 55th minute, he scored the final 2–1 for the Aragonese – his first goal since May 2009 – and cried profusely as he celebrated.

Villarreal

In the last day of the 2011 summer transfer window, Uche signed with Villarreal CF, being immediately loaned out to Granada CF. On 17 September, he scored the game's only goal against the team that held his rights, in a home fixture.

Subsequently, returned to the Yellow Submarine, Uche led his team in scoring as it returned to the top division in 2013. Highlights included braces in home wins over CD Mirandés (2–0), Sporting de Gijón (2–1), Girona FC (4–1) and at Racing de Santander (3–0). On 6 January 2014, back in the top tier, he scored his first hat-trick as a professional to help to a 5–2 away rout of Rayo Vallecano.

Later years
On 20 June 2015, Uche signed with Mexican side Tigres UANL for €3.5 million on a three-year contract. On 2 February of the following year he returned to Spain, being loaned to Málaga CF.

On 10 August 2016, Uche agreed to a one-year deal with Gimnàstic de Tarragona in the Spanish second division. Roughly one year later, he extended his contract until 2019.

International career
Uche made his debut for Nigeria in 2007. He was part of the squad that competed in the 2008 Africa Cup of Nations in Ghana, helping the Super Eagles to the quarter-finals.

Uche was called up to the 23-man squad for the 2013 Africa Cup of Nations, contributing with four scoreless appearances to the eventual champions.

Personal life
Uche's older brother, Kalu Uche, was also a footballer. Also a forward, he too spent most of his senior career in Spain (they are not related to two other players, Uche Okechukwu and Ikechukwu Kalu); his name, Ikechukwu, meant "God's Power" in Igbo.

Uche made a cameo appearance in the music video for Touchin Body, by J. Martins and DJ Arafat.

Career statistics
Scores and results list Nigeria's goal tally first, score column indicates score after each Uche goal.

Honours
Recreativo
Segunda División: 2005–06

Nigeria
Africa Cup of Nations: 2013

Individual
Pichichi Trophy (Segunda División): 2005–06

References

External links

Official website

1984 births
Living people
People from Aba, Abia
Nigerian footballers
Igbo sportspeople
Association football forwards
Heartland F.C. players
La Liga players
Segunda División players
Racing de Ferrol footballers
Recreativo de Huelva players
Getafe CF footballers
Real Zaragoza players
Villarreal CF players
Granada CF footballers
Málaga CF players
Gimnàstic de Tarragona footballers
Tigres UANL footballers
Nigeria international footballers
2008 Africa Cup of Nations players
2013 Africa Cup of Nations players
Africa Cup of Nations-winning players
Nigerian expatriate footballers
Expatriate footballers in Spain
Expatriate footballers in Mexico
Nigerian expatriate sportspeople in Spain
Nigerian expatriate sportspeople in Mexico